Djimini (Jinmini) is a southern Senufo language of Ivory Coast. Blacksmiths among the Djimini once spoke Tonjon, a Mande language.

References

Tagwana–Djimini languages
Languages of Ivory Coast